The Philippine Senate Committee on Sports is a standing committee of the Senate of the Philippines.

This committee, along with the Committee on Games and Amusement, was formed after the Committee on Games, Amusement and Sports was split into two on August 1, 2016, pursuant to Senate Resolution No. 3 of the 17th Congress.

Jurisdiction 
According to the Rules of the Senate, the committee handles all matters relating to the promotion of physical fitness, and professional and amateur sports development in the Philippines.

Members, 18th Congress 
Based on the Rules of the Senate, the Senate Committee on Sports has 9 members.

The President Pro Tempore, the Majority Floor Leader, and the Minority Floor Leader are ex officio members.

Here are the members of the committee in the 18th Congress as of September 24, 2020:

Committee secretary: Horace R. Cruda

See also 

 List of Philippine Senate committees

References 

Sports
Sports in the Philippines